Magnum Opus is the only album released by Top Quality. The album was released on May 24, 1994 though RCA Records. Parrish "PMD" Smith of EPMD served as the album's executive producer.

Though it had input from PMD, the album found nowhere near the amount of success that EPMD and members of their Hit Squad had attained. Magnum Opus only made it to 95 on the Billboard'''s Top R&B/Hip-Hop Albums and its two singles, "I Can't Hear You" and "What", failed to appear on any Billboard'' charts. After the album's failure, Top Quality was dropped from the label.

Track listing
"Messages from Uptown"- 3:19  
"Someone So Fly"- 3:12  
"Caught Up In the Flizny"- 3:37  
"Magnum Opus"- 3:42  
"Check the Credentials"- 4:23  
"What"- 4:42  
"You Gotta Check It"- 4:11  
"Something New"- 2:35  
"I Can't Hear You"- 3:39  
"Graveyard Shift"- 4:09  
"U Know My Name"- 4:30

Samples
"Messages from Uptown"
"Blind Alley" by Emotions
"Magnum Opus"
"Ashley's Roachclip" by The Soul Searchers
"Step Into Our Life" by Roy Ayers and Wayne Henderson
"Check The Credentials"
"Corey Died on the Battlefield" by The Wild Magnolias
"What"
"Ode To Billie Joe" by Lou Donaldson

1993 debut albums
RCA Records albums